A roadstead (or roads – the earlier form)  is a body of water sheltered from rip currents, spring tides, or ocean swell where ships can lie reasonably safely at anchor without dragging or snatching. It can be open or natural, usually estuary-based, or may be created artificially. In maritime law, it is described as a "known general station for ships, notoriously used as such, and distinguished by the name".

Definition 
A roadstead can be an area of safe anchorage for ships waiting to enter a port, or to form a convoy. If sufficiently sheltered and convenient, it can be used for the transshipment of goods, stores, and troops, either separately or in combination. The same applies in transfers to and from shore by lighters.
In the days of sailing ships, some voyages could only easily be made with a change in wind direction, and ships would wait for a change of wind in a safe anchorage, such as the Downs or Yarmouth Roads.

Notable roadsteads

 Basque Roads, France 
 Bolivar Roads, Galveston, Texas, US
 Roadstead of Brest, France
 Carrick Roads, England
 Castle Roads, Bermuda
 Cherbourg Harbour (la Grande Rade), France (artificial)
 The Downs, England
 Fayal Roads, Azores, Portugal (Battle of Fayal)
 Gage Roads, Western Australia
 Hampton Roads, Virginia, US
 Kossol Roads, Micronesia 
 Lahaina Roads, Hawaii, US
 Lingga Roads, near Singapore
 Roadstead of Lorient, France
 The Nore, England
 Puget Sound, Washington, US
 Royal Roads, Canada 
 Scapa Flow, Scotland
 Schillig Roads, Germany 
 Spithead, England
 Tail of the Bank, Scotland (Clyde estuary)
 Roadstead of Tallinn, Estonia
 Tiefwasserreede, Germany
 Toulon Roads, France
 Road Town, Tortola, British Virgin Islands
 Rede van Texel, Texel, Netherlands (historic)
 Roosevelt Roads Naval Station, Ceiba, Puerto Rico

See also
 Anchorage

Notes

References

External links 
 Harbor Types of the World's Large Sized Ports , Hofstra University site
 Ports and Ocean Distances, searoutes.com

 
Water transport
Coastal and oceanic landforms
Nautical terminology